The signalling system used on the rail transport in Norway is regulated by the Regulations of December 4, 2001 no. 1336 about signals and signs on the state's railway network and connected private tracks.

The first signalling system on the Norwegian railway system was a mechanically operated semaphore system introduced at Drammen station in 1893. The first electrically operated light signal system was delivered by AEG in 1924. Today, only electrically operated light signals are used.

Train radio
Between 1993 and 1996, NSB rolled out the analog train radio system Scanet. Developed by Ascom Radiocom, it was only installed on the primary railway lines. The system allows radio communication between a train dispatcher, and train drivers and other users involved in railway operations. Scanet was also connected to the automatic train control system. However, several lines lack the system, including the Arendal Line, the Flåm Line, the Meråker Line, the Nordland Line, the Rauma Line, the Røros Line, the Inner Østfold Line, the northern part of the Gjøvik Line, and several tunnels along the Bergen Line and the Sørland Line. The Åsta accident in 2000 spurred the need to give all parts of the railway coverage with train radio. On these lines, the dispatcher and drivers had to communicate using the Nordic Mobile Telephone (NMT 450) standard, a system which the operator Telenor discontinued in 2002.

Scanet was replaced by Global System for Mobile Communication – Railway (GSM-R) between 2004 2007, with the systems first being installed on the lines without Scanet. The system, delivered by Nokia Siemens Networks, was on time and on budget, and made Norway one of the first countries to fully implement the system throughout Europe. After GSM-R was fully implemented on 1 November, Scanet was gradually closed. The new system has been characterized as simpler to use and giving better audio quality than Scanet. The implementation cost 1.8 billion Norwegian krone and covers the entire network.

Means of signalling 
The following means of signalling are used:

 Signal flags
 Hand-held signal lamps
 Signal whistle
 Arm signals
 Fixed light signals
 Fixed sound signals
 Signal signs
 Orientation posts
 Locomotive whistle
 Locomotive and train signal lamps

The fundamental meaning of the signal colors 
 Red always indicates "stop".
 Violet indicates that the associated level crossing signal is showing "Stop short of the level crossing".
 Yellow indicates "caution".
 Green indicates "permission to run".
 White indicates "clear line".

Light signals 
Light signals show one of the following aspects:

Main signals

Fail safe 
If one of the green lights in signal 22 fails, the indication becomes the lower speed signal 21 – this is fail-safe.  Other nearby countries reverse the role of the single green aspect and double green aspect.

Distant signals

Wrong-side failure 
If the yellow light in signal 24 fails, the signal displays a higher speed indication, which would be a wrong-side failure.  To prevent this, a current transformer in the lamp circuit monitors the current through the yellow lamp. If the yellow lamp fails, a relay will also switch off the green light and the signal becomes totally dark, which is then treated as "expect stop." A capacitor in the relay circuit ensures that the relay operation is a couple of seconds delayed, to prevent the relay operating for every blink. Hence, if the yellow lamp does suddenly fail, the green light will blink alone 1-2 times before it is switched off by the relay. Note: The animated picture of signal 24 is wrongly giving the impression that the yellow light is shown before the green one. This is not correct: The yellow and green lights are always switched on and off simultaneously, for every blink/flash.

Warning systems 
Norway uses the Ericsson ATP warning system, also used on Perth's suburban railway network.

References

External links
Norwegian signalling rulebook